Adrian Williams-Strong (born February 15, 1977) is a former American professional women's basketball player who played in the Women's National Basketball Association (WNBA).

Born in Indianapolis, Indiana, Williams attended college at University of Southern California and graduated in 1999.

Following her collegiate career, she was selected as the 21st overall pick in the 2000 WNBA Draft by the Phoenix Mercury and played in the 2003 WNBA All-Star Game. In July 2004, Williams was dealt to the San Antonio Silver Stars.

After spending the 2005 season in Korea, Williams signed with the Minnesota Lynx in 2006.  She averaged 4.9 points, 4.7 rebounds and 15.2 minutes per game in her return to the WNBA.

In February 2007, the Lynx traded Williams to the Sacramento Monarchs in exchange for a second-round pick in the 2007 WNBA Draft.
Then in the winter of 2008 she played in China un until March 2008 where she hurt her left knee and had to have surgery. Coming home, she decided to take a break from the WNBA to let her knees rest.

On November 4, 2017, she was inducted into the Clovis Unified School District Hall of Fame.

She is married to Buddy Strong, keys player for the Dave Matthews Band, with whom she has one son and one daughter.

WNBA career statistics

Regular season

|-
| align="left" | 2000
| align="left" | Phoenix
| 28 || 2 || 12.5 || .403 || .000 || .526 || 2.5 || 0.6 || 0.5 || 0.1 || 1.0 || 2.8
|-
| align="left" | 2001
| align="left" | Phoenix
| 25 || 1 || 15.0 || .336 || .000 || .714 || 3.0 || 0.4 || 0.6 || 0.2 || 1.4 || 3.8
|-
| align="left" | 2002
| align="left" | Phoenix
| 32 || 30 || 27.4 || .467 || .000 || .700 || 6.9 || 1.1 || 1.5 || 0.9 || 2.0 || 6.3
|-
| align="left" | 2003
| align="left" | Phoenix
| 34 || 33 || 29.0 || .402 || .000 || .612 || 7.4 || 0.9 || 1.7 || 0.6 || 2.1 || 9.8
|-
| align="left" | 2004
| align="left" | Phoenix
| 11 || 8 || 13.2 || .450 || .000 || .786 || 1.9 || 0.5 || 1.0 || 0.5 || 1.4 || 5.9
|-
| align="left" | 2004
| align="left" | San Antonio
| 12 || 0 || 12.4 || .333 || .000 || .286 || 2.3 || 0.7 || 0.7 || 0.1 || 1.0 || 2.7
|-
| align="left" | 2006
| align="left" | Minnesota
| 32 || 0 || 15.2 || .448 || .000 || .536 || 4.7 || 0.3 || 0.8 || 0.3 || 0.6 || 4.9
|-
| align="left" | 2007
| align="left" | Sacramento
| 34 || 2 || 17.9 || .475 || .000 || .788 || 4.5 || 0.8 || 0.6 || 0.2 || 1.7 || 6.2
|-
| align="left" | 2008
| align="left" | Sacramento
| 34 || 33 || 20.2 || .439 || .000 || .614 || 4.9 || 0.6 || 0.6 || 0.2 || 1.6 || 6.1
|-
| align="left" | Career
| align="left" | 8 years, 4 teams
| 242 || 109 || 19.3 || .425 || .000 || .634 || 4.7 || 0.7 || 0.9 || 0.4 || 1.5 || 5.7

Playoffs

|-
| align="left" | 2000
| align="left" | Phoenix
| 2 || 0 || 15.0 || .500 || .000 || .500 || 2.0 || 0.5 || 0.0 || 1.0 || 0.5 || 2.5
|-
| align="left" | 2007
| align="left" | Sacramento
| 3 || 0 || 16.7 || .294 || .000 || .800 || 5.3 || 0.7 || 0.3 || 0.3 || 2.0 || 4.7
|-
| align="left" | 2008
| align="left" | Sacramento
| 3 || 3 || 22.3 || .550 || .000 || .500 || 3.3 || 1.3 || 0.7 || 0.3 || 1.3 || 7.7
|-
| align="left" | Career
| align="left" | 3 years, 2 teams
| 8 || 3 || 18.4 || .439 || .000 || .667 || 3.8 || 0.9 || 0.4 || 0.5 || 1.4 || 5.3

Southern California statistics
Source

Overseas
During the 2006-2007 offseason, she played for Perfumerias Avenida in Spain, averaging 10.0 points (40.9 FG%, 33.3 3FG%, 50.0 FT%), 8.5 rebounds, 0.5 assists, 1.7 steals, 0.7 blocks and 27.3 minutes per game.

References

External links
 
 
 February 14, 2007 press release on her being acquired by the Monarchs

1977 births
Living people
American expatriate basketball people in China
American expatriate basketball people in South Korea
American expatriate basketball people in Spain
American women's basketball players
Basketball players from California
Jiangsu Phoenix players
Minnesota Lynx players
Phoenix Mercury draft picks
Phoenix Mercury players
Power forwards (basketball)
Sacramento Monarchs players
San Antonio Stars players
Sportspeople from Fresno, California
USC Trojans women's basketball players
Women's Korean Basketball League players
Women's National Basketball Association All-Stars
21st-century American women